Dingboche (दिङबोचे)  is a Sherpa village in the Khumbu region of north eastern Nepal in the Chukhung Valley. Its population was estimated at approximately 200 in 2011.

Tourism

Dingboche is a popular stop for trekkers and climbers headed to Mount Everest, Ama Dablam or Imja Tse. Parties will typically spend two nights in Dingboche for acclimatization purposes.

The village relies heavily on tourists with lodges and tenting areas comprising most of Dingboche. The Imja River flows directly east of the village.

A helicopter landing pad is located just west of the Imja River, near Moonlight Lodge. Dingboche is home to an Internet cafe (using satellite technology) and one of the world's highest billiard parlors.

One of the characteristics of Dingboche is the kilometers of stone walls, built using the stones of different sizes that cover the entire Valley of Imja. These stones are removed in order to plow the soil and end up being piled one over the other creating kilometers of walls.

Transport
Coming from Namche Bazaar or Tengboche, Dingboche is the better alternative than the village of Pheriche, in being more sunny, and  less affected by the icy winds that descend through the Valley of Khumbu.
There are no roads that go to the village, only trails, and with the exceptions of some agricultural products produced around the village; yaks and mules carry most of what is consumed locally.

Climate
Dingboche has a Tundra climate (Köppen classification ET). It has cool and rainy summers and dry and cold winters, affected mainly by its altitude and by monsoon in the summer. For those who will do trekking, the spring season (March and April) and autumn (October and November) are the ideal times because the visibility of the mountains is ideal and the temperature is not too cold. During the winter it is possible to trek, but the vast majority of places of accommodation are closed and the cold is intense and it is rarely above freezing point.

Gallery

Notes

External links

 Travelpod Dingboche

Populated places in Solukhumbu District
Khumbu Pasanglhamu